The Declaration of Independence of Azerbaijan is the pronouncement adopted by the Azerbaijani National Council meeting in Tiflis on 28 May 1918, declaring the independence of the Azerbaijan Democratic Republic.

After a century of living under Russian imperial rule and later being influenced by European ideas of nationalism, Azerbaijanis formed their own national identity and national movements. Following the fall of the Tsarist government in Russia as a result of the October Revolution, the Caucasian peoples, including Azerbaijanis, formed a Special Committee, which was followed by a Commissariat and, finally, the independent Transcaucasian Democratic Federative Republic. The new federation lasted only six weeks before Georgia declared its independence from it. Armenia and Azerbaijan followed two days later, on 28 May 1918.

The Azerbaijan Democratic Republic only lasted 23 months and collapsed in April 1920 after the Soviet invasion of Azerbaijan. The Azerbaijan Soviet Socialist Republic was formed in its place as part of the Soviet Union. After the collapse of the USSR on 18 October 1991, the Parliament of Azerbaijan, relying on the Declaration of Independence of 1918, adopted the Constitutional Act "On the State Independence of the Republic of Azerbaijan".

The original copies of the Declaration of Independence, written in the Arabic script of the Azerbaijani language and French are kept in the National Museum of History of Azerbaijan in Baku. The day of the adoption of the Declaration—28 May—is celebrated as the Independence Day in Azerbaijan and is considered a non-working day.

History

Background 
Prior to the twentieth century, Azerbaijanis had lived under Russian colonial rule for a century and had never had their own nation-state. Azerbaijanis lacked a sense of national identity, and their unity was based solely on religion. By the late nineteenth century, however, European ideas of nationalism had begun to influence the Near East, and the Russian government's harsh colonial practices gave birth to various national movements among the Russian Empire's Turkic peoples. This sparked a new sense of national identity among the Caucasus peoples, including Azerbaijanis. Religious influence had begun to wane among Azerbaijanis, and it had been replaced by their own nationalism, which had taken on a Pan-Turkic and Pan-Islamic hue at times. According to historian Arthur Tsutsiev that the term "Azerbaijani" didn't possess a "narrow ethnic or linguistic connotation", and that the "final ethnicization" occurred during the 1920–1930s during Soviet rule after the "term 'Azerbaijani' started to be equated with 'Azeri Turk' and later supplanted this term".

The Provisional Government, created for the organization of elections to the Russian Constituent Assembly and its convention, established a Special Committee to administer the region until Russian order was restored; however, the committee was replaced 21 days later, on 28 November, by the Transcaucasian Commissariat. Formed with the express purpose of being a caretaker government, the Commissariat was not able to govern strongly: it was dependent on national councils, formed around the same time and based on ethnic lines, for military support and was effectively powerless to enforce any laws it passed.

With no desire to follow the lead of the Bolsheviks, the Commissariat agreed to form their own legislative body so that the Transcaucasus could have a legitimate government and properly negotiate with the Ottoman Empire, which was invading the Caucasus at the time. Thus on 23 February 1918, they established the "Seim" ('legislature') in Tiflis. The Seim comprised ten different parties. Three dominated, each representing one major ethnic group: the Georgian Mensheviks and the Azerbaijani Musavat party, both with 30 seats, and the Armenian Revolutionary Federation, with 27.

The Seim and the Ottomans held a peace conference in Trabzon to seek peace on 14 March, however, the Ottoman forces invaded the Caucasus again during a recess in the peace conference. The Seim deliberated on the best course of action, with the majority of delegates favouring a political solution. On 20 March, Ottoman delegates proposed that the Seim could return to negotiations only if they declared independence. In the face of Ottoman military superiority, the Georgian National Council determined that Transcaucasia's only option was to declare independence. On 22 April, the idea was debated in the Seim, with Georgians leading the way, noting that Ottoman representatives had agreed to resume peace talks if the Transcaucasus met them as an independent state. 

The decision to move forward was not unanimous at first: the mostly Armenian Dashnaks believed that stopping the Ottoman military's advance was the best option at the time, though they were hesitant to give up so much territory, while the Musavats, who represented Azerbaijani interests, were still hesitant to fight fellow Muslims, but conceded that independence was the only way to ensure the region was not divided by foreign states. The Bolshevik takeover of Baku added to the pressure on Transcaucasia to resolve its status. Thus, the Transcaucasian Democratic Federative Republic declared independence on 22 April 1918. However, independence did not halt Ottoman advances and on 26 May 1918, Georgia declared its independence, effectively ending the Transcaucasian Democratic Federative Republic only six weeks after it was established.

Adoption of the Declaration of Independence 

After the dissolution of the Transcaucasian Democratic Federative Republic, members of the defunct Seim's Muslim Faction (i.e. Muslim National Council) convened an emergency meeting to discuss the current political situation on 27 May 1918. After a lengthy debate, the Muslim National Council proclaimed itself the Azerbaijani National Council and became the first delegated legislative body in Azerbaijan's history. At its first meeting, the Musavat Party nominated Mammad Amin Rasulzade as the council's Chairman. He won the vote of all parties of the Council except the Ittihad Muslim Party and was elected the Chairman of the National Council. At the same time, Hasan bey Aghayev and Mir Hidayat bey Seyidov were elected the Deputy Chairmen. At the same meeting, a nine-member legislative body of the National Council was established to govern different cities of Azerbaijan, and Fatali Khan Khoyski was elected chairman of this body.

A day later, on 28 May, the National Council convened a meeting chaired by Hasan bey Aghayev in the Great Hall on the second floor of the palace of the former Viceroy of the Russian Emperor in the Caucasus in Tiflis. During the meeting, the establishment of the Azerbaijan Democratic Republic and the signing of the 6-item "Declaration of National Independence" were announced.

Tsutsiev adds that as Azerbaijan's declaration of independence referenced "peoples of Azerbaijan as the holders of sovereign rights", it was "better suited to the incorporation of ethnic minorities than were the Georgian and Armenian nations." Thereby, Azerbaijan in taking up a "religion-based orientation" claimed territories containing a "significiant Muslim population", including regions such as Batum, Zakatal, and "a portion of Daghestan" which contained Adjarians and Avars, respectively. Ergo, Azerbaijan was organised to become a "multiethnic country uniting Transcaucasian Muslims".

Composition of the National Council of Azerbaijan 
The following were the members of Azerbaijan's National Council at the time of its declaration of independence:

Proceedings of the meeting 
Hasan bey Agayev, who had just returned from Yelisavetpol (present-day Ganja), gave detailed information on the first issue about the situation in the city and governorate of Elisabethpol, as well as the arrival of a few Turkish officers there. Aghayev stressed that the arrival of Turkish officers in Elisabethpol had nothing to do with the future organization of the political life of Azerbaijan. He added that the Turks do not pursue any aggressive goals in Azerbaijan and on the contrary, support the preservation of Azerbaijan and the Transcaucasian Republic.

Councilmember Khalil bey Khasmammadov gave a report justifying the importance and urgency of declaring Azerbaijan an independent republic. Nasib bey Yusifbeyli, Akbar agha Sheykhulislamov, Mir Hidayat bey Seyidov and others supported Khasmammadov's idea. Councilmember Fatali Khan Khoyski proposed to postpone the declaration of Azerbaijan's independence until a number of issues on the ground were resolved. He also proposed to form a full-fledged government to hold negotiations with other countries. A number of speakers also mentioned this. After an active and comprehensive discussion of the issue, Secretary Mustafa Mahmudov read the names of those participating in the vote: with twenty four votes and two abstentions, it was decided to declare Azerbaijan as an independent democratic republic within eastern and south-eastern Transcaucasia. Of the 26 members of the National Council, only  and one of the leaders of the Ittihad party,  abstained. Then, the Council instructed Fatali Khan Khoyski to form the first interim government of the Azerbaijan Democratic Republic.

After an hour-long break, Khoyski announced the composition of the interim government consisting of the following people:

Text of the Declaration of Independence

Telegrams about the independence 
On 30 May 1918, Prime Minister Fatali Khan Khoyski sent a telegram about the Independence of Azerbaijan to the world's major political centres, including Istanbul, Berlin, Vienna, Paris, London, Rome, Washington, Sofia, Bucharest, Tehran, Madrid, The Hague, Moscow, Stockholm, Kyiv, Kristiania (Oslo), Copenhagen and Tokyo. The document stated that due to the withdrawal of the Democratic Republic of Georgia from the union, the Transcaucasian Democratic Federal Republic collapsed, and on 28 May 1918, the National Council of the Azerbaijan Democratic Republic adopted a Declaration of Independence. The foreign ministers of the countries to which the telegram was sent were asked to inform their governments. The report stated that the government was temporarily located in Elisabethpol (Ganja).

History of the original copies of the Declaration of Independence 
At the end of World War I in 1918, a Peace Conference was convened in Paris to conclude peace treaties and form a new world map. The newly independent government of Azerbaijan, along with 27 countries, sent a state delegation to the conference. Headed by Alimardan bey Topchubashov, the delegation went to Paris with the purpose to gain de facto recognition of Azerbaijan as an independent state. The delegation brought a copy of the Declaration of Independence, both in the original Azerbaijani and a French translation. On 28 May 1919, on the first anniversary of the independence of the Azerbaijan Democratic Republic, the Azerbaijani delegation met with the US President Woodrow Wilson, one of the key figures in the Peace Conference. The delegation was successful, and on 11 January 1920 the Supreme Council of the Paris Peace Conference recognized Azerbaijan as a de facto independent state. However the Red Army invaded Azerbaijan on 27 April 1920, and the Azerbaijan Democratic Republic was dissolved the next day, so the delegation remained in France.

The copies of the Declaration of Independence that they took with them, were soon lost. In 2014, the original copies in Azerbaijani and French were found in London, and donated to the National History Museum of Azerbaijan on 13 May by the president Ilham Aliyev.

Legacy

Historical significance 
The adoption of the Declaration of Independence of Azerbaijan made the Azerbaijan Democratic Republic the first modern republic in the Islamic world. On 28 May 1933, Mammad Amin Rasulzade wrote in the  newspaper published in Berlin:

On 30 August 1991, at an extraordinary session of the Supreme Soviet of Azerbaijan, the declaration "On the Restoration of the State Independence of the Republic of Azerbaijan" was adopted on the basis of the 1918 declaration. The Supreme Soviet subsequently adopted the Constitutional Act "On the State Independence of the Republic of Azerbaijan" on 18 October 1991, which laid the political and economic foundation of the Republic of Azerbaijan. The Act reads:

With this document, the Republic of Azerbaijan was declared the successor of the Azerbaijan Democratic Republic. Historian Sevinj Yusifzadeh notes that the Declaration of Independence of Azerbaijan laid the foundation of Azerbaijan's foreign policy, as the document states the need for the Azerbaijan Democratic Republic to establish friendly relations with all countries.

Independence Day 

On 28 May 1919, on the occasion of the first anniversary of the Declaration of Independence, a large celebration was held in Baku. At a special session of the National Council, Hasan bey Aghayev and Mammad Amin Rasulzade made congratulatory speeches. The Azerbaijan newspaper published an article by Azerbaijani poet Uzeyir Hajibeyov titled "One Year". However, on the same day, a communist demonstration was held under the slogan "Independent Soviet Azerbaijan" against the anniversary of Azerbaijan's independence.

Soon after the collapse of the Azerbaijan Democratic Republic, the day of the Declaration of Azerbaijan's Independence was celebrated by Azerbaijani immigrants outside Azerbaijan. A 1926 article by Alimardan bey Topchubashov titled "Among the Caucasians" described the celebration of the 8th anniversary of the declaration of independence of the Republic of Azerbaijan in Paris.

On 21 May 1990, by the decree of the president Ayaz Mutallibov, 28 May was designated as the "Day of Restoration of Independence" day (while the Independence Day was celebrated on 18 October). On 15 October 2021, Parliament of Azerbaijan adopted the bill "On Independence Day", under which 28 May was designated as the new Independence Day, while 18 October became the new Restoration of Independence Day.

The Declaration of Independence monument 

On 18 December 2006, the president of Azerbaijan Ilham Aliyev signed Order No. 1838 on the creation of the Museum of Independence and the establishment of the Monument of Independence in Baku. The opening of the monument took place on 25 May 2007, on Istiglaliyyat Street. Ilham Aliyev attended the opening ceremony. Carved from granite and white marble, the monument is engraved with the text of the Declaration of Independence in both the old Arabic and modern Latin scripts.

Notes

References

Literature

External links 
 

1918 in Azerbaijan
1918 in international relations
Azerbaijan
Modern history of Azerbaijan
May 1918 events
1918 documents
History of Tbilisi
Separatism in Russia